Chayuttra Pramongkhol formerly Sirivimon Pramongkhol (born 29 November 1994) is a Thai weightlifter. She competed at the 2012 Summer Olympics in the Women's 48 kg, finishing in 4th place. In 2018 she was banned until 2020 by the International Weightlifting Federation after testing positive for 5a- androstane-3a, 17 bdiol (5aAdiol) and 5b-androstane-3a, 17 b-diol (5bAdiol).

She won the silver medal in the women's 45kg event at the 2022 World Weightlifting Championships held in Bogotá, Colombia.

Results

References

External links

Chayuttra Pramongkhol
1994 births
Living people
Chayuttra Pramongkhol
Weightlifters at the 2012 Summer Olympics
Weightlifters at the 2010 Summer Youth Olympics
World Weightlifting Championships medalists
Chayuttra Pramongkhol